Acrolophus rupestris is a moth of the family Acrolophidae. It is found on Jamaica.

References

Moths described in 1914
rupestris